Michael Rosenberg (born March 7, 1954) is an American bridge player.

Rosenberg was born in New York City, moved to Scotland as a child, and returned to New York in 1978.  He lived in New York State with his wife Debbie, also a top player, from 1995 until 2011 when the couple moved to Northern California.

Michael won the 1994 Rosenblum Cup, the 2017 Bermuda Bowl, and the 2018 World Mixed Teams Championship. As of 2007 he has won fourteen North American championships, as well as multiple wins in the major invitational tournaments. He has also won the World Bridge Federation (WBF) Par competition in 1998, a test of declarer play skill, and is known for his advocacy of a high standard of ethical behavior for players. He is known as "The expert's expert" for his encyclopedic knowledge of cardplay techniques, and a frequent contributor for The Bridge World.

Bridge accomplishments

Awards
 ACBL Hall of Fame, 2015
 ACBL Player of the Year 1994, 2003
 Fishbein Trophy 2003
 Herman Trophy 1996

Wins
 World Mixed Teams Championship (1) 2018 
 Bermuda Bowl (1) 2017 
 Rosenblum Cup (1) 1994 
 
 Compaq World Par Contest (1) 1998
 North American Bridge Championships (14)
 von Zedtwitz Life Master Pairs (1) 2000 
 Silodor Open Pairs (1) 2003 
 Blue Ribbon Pairs (1) 1993 
 Nail Life Master Open Pairs (1) 1992 
 Vanderbilt (2) 1994, 1996 
 Mitchell Board-a-Match Teams (3) 1991, 1996, 2006 
 Chicago Mixed Board-a-Match (1) 2002 
 Reisinger (2) 1989, 1996 
 Spingold (2) 1991, 2003 
 Roth Open Swiss Teams (1) 2022
 United States Bridge Championships (4)
 Open Team Trials(4) 1992, 1997, 1999, 2006
 European Open Bridge Championships (1)
 Mixed Teams (1) 2003
 European Championships (1)
 Junior Teams (1) 1978
 British Championships (1)
 Gold Cup (1) 1976
 Other notable wins:
 Cavendish Invitational Teams (1) 1986
 Cap Gemini Pandata World Top Invitational Pairs (1) 1992 
 Cap Volmac World Top Invitational Pairs (1) 1995
 Sunday Times Invitational Pairs (1) 1976
 Cavendish Invitational Pairs (1) 1986 
 Goldman Pairs (2) 2008, 2009

Runners-up
 Bermuda Bowl (1) 2007
 World Open Team Olympiad (1) 1992
 World Open Pairs (2) 1994, 2002
 North American Bridge Championships (18)
 von Zedtwitz Life Master Pairs (1) 2003 
 Lebhar IMP Pairs (1) 2006 
 Silodor Open Pairs (1) 1994 
 Grand National Teams (1) 1981 
 Jacoby Open Swiss Teams (2) 1992, 2014 
 Roth Open Swiss Teams (2) 2011, 2013 
 Vanderbilt (3) 1990, 1991, 2000 
 Mitchell Board-a-Match Teams (1) 2004 
 Reisinger (3) 2002, 2003, 2005 
 Spingold (3) 1980, 1993, 1995 
 United States Bridge Championships (5)
 Open Team Trials (7) 1996, 2000, 2002, 2004, 2005, 2013, 2017
 Other notable 2nd places:
 Cavendish Invitational Pairs (1) 1978

References

External links
 Michael Rosenberg at Bridge Winners 
 
 
 Bridge, Zia and Me, Google eBook edition

1954 births
Living people
American contract bridge players
Bermuda Bowl players
Contract bridge writers
British and Irish contract bridge players
Sportspeople from New York City
American expatriates in the United Kingdom